Synodontis punu is a species of upside-down catfish native to the Republic of the Congo and Gabon, where it is known from the Nyanga, Kouilou-Niari and Ngounié river basins. This species grows to a length of  SL.

References

External links 

punu
Taxa named by Emmanuel J. Vreven
Taxa named by Lucie Milondo
Freshwater fish of Africa
Fish of the Republic of the Congo
Fish of Gabon
Fish described in 2009